An Acrisol is a Reference Soil Group of the World Reference Base for Soil Resources (WRB). It has a clay-rich subsoil and is associated with humid, tropical climates, such as those found in Brazil, and often supports forested areas. In the USDA soil taxonomy, Acrisols correspond to the Humult, Udult and Ustult suborders of the Ultisols and also to Oxisols with a kandic horizon and to some Alfisols. The Acrisols low fertility and toxic amounts of aluminium pose limitations to its agricultural use, favouring  in many places its use for silviculture, low intensity pasture and protected areas. Crops that can be successfully cultivated, if climate allows, include tea, rubber tree, oil palm, coffee and sugar cane.

See also 
Soil horizon
Soil type

References 

Acrisols

Further reading 
 W. Zech, P. Schad, G. Hintermaier-Erhard: Soils of the World. Springer, Berlin 2022, Chapter 7.3.1.

External links 
 profile photos (with classification) WRB homepage
 profile photos (with classification) IUSS World of Soils

Pedology
Types of soil